Nanette Carolyn Carter, born January 30, 1954, in Columbus, Ohio, is an African-American artist and college educator living and working in New York City, best known for her collages with paper, canvas and Mylar (archival plastic sheets).

Daughter of Frances Hill Carter (January 13, 1920 – February 2, 2015) and Matthew G. Carter (October 16, 1913 – March 14, 2012), Nanette and her sister, Bettye Carter Freeman, grew up in Montclair, New Jersey, and graduated from Montclair High School. Her father served as the city's first African American Mayor (1968-1972), and her mother was an elementary school teacher who also taught dance, later becoming a reading specialist and Vice Principal in the Paterson Public Schools.

Early and professional life 
In 1960, Carter's family moved from Ohio to Montclair, New Jersey.  A doctor of divinity, her father was also a civil rights leader dedicated to social justice and housing reforms and served as Chair of the New Jersey Commission on Civil Rights.

Carter earned a BA from Oberlin College in 1976, majoring in Studio Art and Art History.  During her junior year at Oberlin, she lived and studied at the Accademia di Belle Arti in Perugia, Italy. After graduating, Carter enrolled in Pratt Institute, Brooklyn, NY, where she earned her Master of Fine Arts in 1978.  That year, she began teaching printmaking and drawing at the Dwight-Englewood School, Englewood, New Jersey, while she continued to develop her career as a full-time practicing artist.

Since 1981, Carter's professional career in the arts has included extensive lecturing and teaching, conducting workshops and serving as a panelist and juror for many universities and art institutions.  Recent invitations include Bard College, NY (lecture), Museo Nacional de Bellas Artes, Havana, Cuba (lecture), University of Hawaii, Hilo, Hawaii (lecture), Wayne State University, MI (lecture), Concordia College, NY (lecture)

Since 2001, Carter has taught drawing at Pratt Institute, Brooklyn, NY, where she is a tenured Adjunct Associate Professor.

Creative practice 
In a 1984 Cooper-Hewitt Museum of Decorative Arts and Design exhibition, “Frank Lloyd Wright and the Prairie School,” Carter first saw Mylar in use by many of Wright's students. Known today for her collages with paper, canvas and Mylar (archival plastic sheets), Carter's work is recognized for its complex compositions, paintings, and drawings

Her work directly responds to contemporary issues around war, injustices and technology.  She seeks to address the need for “negotiating the realities of inequality seen around the world” as evident in her series “Afro-Sentinels II" that emanates from the desire to combat racial injustice with a cadre of vigilant guards.  A body of recent work, begun in 2013, “Cantilevered” becomes a metaphor for 21st Century life, “living with technology advancing every day, forcing one to look at global issues….responsibilities....a deluge of information and history.”   In her creative practice for many years, Carter has been dedicated to working with intangible ideas around contemporary issues in an abstract vocabulary of form, line and color, and to present the mysteries of nature and human nature.  She seeks to achieve at the same time luminosity, transparency and density in her compositions.

Honors and exhibitions 
Carter has been awarded many honors including the Anonymous Was A Woman Award (2021), The Adolph and Esther Gottlieb Foundation Grant, NY (2014), Artists’ Fellowship Inc. Grant, NY (2013), The Mayer Foundation Grant, NY (2013),  Cultural Envoy to Syria, (2007) chosen by the US State Department to represent US at the 7th Annual Women's Art Festival in Aleppo, Syria, Mudd Library, Oberlin College (2003) Commission, OH, and invitations to be a resident artist at Hydra Art Project (2017), Perugia, Italy and the Experimental Printmaking Institute (2015), Lafayette College, PA.

Carter's work has also been shown in numerous solo and group exhibitions and is represented in over 45 corporate collections in addition to museum, library and university collections, including: The National Museum of Fine Arts, Havana, Cuba, The Studio Museum, New York, NY, Yale University Art Gallery, New Haven, CT, The Pennsylvania Academy of the Fine Arts, Philadelphia, PA, The Brandywine Workshop and Archives, Philadelphia, Museum of Art, Rhode Island School of Design, Providence, RI, among others.

Further reading 
 Visions of our 44th President. Charles H. Wright Museum of African American History, Regal Printing Ltd, Hong Kong, 2015
 Profile, Nanette Carter.  Charlotte Savidge.  D x D – Differentiate by Design. Pratt Institute, NY March 2016
 “Bouquet for Loving.  My Mentor My Comrade,” Nanette Carter. “On Using Scapes,” Nanette Carter.   Black Renaissance Noire, Institute of African American Affairs, New York University, NY, pp 91–95, 89,  Vol 9, No 2-3,  2009/2010
 “Nanette Carter at G. R. N”Namdi.” Jonathan Goodman.  Art in America, January  2007
 American Artist at Kozah Gallery.  Tisheen.  Damascus, Syria, November 27, 2007
 Aqueous. Leslie King-Hammond. Ph.D.. G.R. N’Namdi Gallery, New York, NY 2006
 Review.  Margaret Hawkins. Art News, December 2005 
 Creating Their Own Image:  African American Women Artists. Lisa Farrington, Ph.D., Oxford University Press, Oxford, England. 2004
 Three Decades of American Printmaking. The Brandywine Workshop Collection.  Allan Edmunds, ed., Hudson Hills Press, VT. pg 133, 2004
 A Visual Explosion in Harlem. Cherilyn Wright. The International Review of African American Art. Hampton University, Hampton, VA. Vol 18, No 4. 2003
 Six American Masters. Holland Cotter. The New York Times, NY, June 14, 2002
 The Artist’s Way. O The Oprah Magazine, Hearst Communications, NY, p 230, November 2001
 Metaphors on Mylar. Edward Sozanski. The Philadelphia Inquirer, PA, October 22, 1999
 Interview of Nanette Carter. Calvin Reid. Artist and Influence.  James Hatch, ed. Hatch-Billops Collection, Inc., New York, NY 1998  
 Beyond the Veil:  Art of African American Artists at Century’s End. Mary Jane Hewitt, Ph.D.  Cornell Fine Arts Museum, Rollins College, Winter Park, FL, 1998
 Fresh Paint! New York Scene. Jonell Jaime. The International Review of African American Art, Hampton University Museum, Hampton, VA, Vol 13, No 13, 1997
 Bearing Witness: Contemporary Works by African American Women Artists.  Lowery Stokes Sims, Judith Wilson et al. Spelman College Museum of Fine Art, Atlanta, GA and Rizzoli International Publications, Inc., NY, 1996
 Gambo Ya Ya:  Anthology of Contemporary African-American Women Artists.  Leslie King-Hammond, Ph.D.  Introduction. Midmarch Arts Press, NY 1995

References

21st-century American women artists
American abstract artists
African-American contemporary artists
American contemporary artists
Pratt Institute alumni
1954 births
Living people
African-American women artists
20th-century American women artists
Artists from New Jersey
Montclair High School (New Jersey) alumni
Oberlin College alumni
People from Montclair, New Jersey
Artists from Columbus, Ohio
20th-century African-American women
20th-century African-American people
20th-century African-American artists
21st-century African-American women
21st-century African-American artists